Karin Janke (born 14 October 1963, in Wolfsburg) is a retired German sprinter who specialized in the 400 metres. She represented the sports club VfL Wolfsburg.

Achievements

References

1963 births
Living people
German female sprinters
Athletes (track and field) at the 1988 Summer Olympics
Olympic athletes of West Germany
People from Wolfsburg
Sportspeople from Lower Saxony
European Athletics Championships medalists
Universiade medalists in athletics (track and field)
Universiade silver medalists for West Germany
Medalists at the 1989 Summer Universiade
Olympic female sprinters
20th-century German women